Neobuxbaumia polylopha is found only in Mexico and is confined to a small area in the state of Guanajuato.  It grows only in canyons with limestone slopes, similar to the cacti Neobuxbaumia multiareolata,   Neobuxbaumia sanchezmejunadae, and Neobuxbaumia squamulosa.  Neobuxbaumia polylopha is not well known among locals and has no local uses.  However, it is popular among cactus enthusiasts and reproduces well in nurseries.

Classification 
The common names of Neobuxbaumia polylopha are the cone cactus, golden saguaro, golden spined saguaro, and wax cactus.  Polylopha means many ribs.  Neobuxbaumia polylopha also has many synonym scientific names due to being reclassified.  The synonyms include Cereus polylophus, Pilocereus polylophus, Cephalocereus polylophus, and Carnegiea polylopha.  It was classified as being part of the Stenocerinae subtribe of the Pachycereeae in 1975 by Buxbaum.

Anatomy 
The form of Neobuxbaumia polylopha is a single large arborescent stalk.  It can grow to heights of over 15 meters and can grow to weigh many tons.  The pith of the cactus can be as wide as 20 centimeters.  The columnar stem of the cactus has between 10 and 30 ribs, with 4 to 8 spines arranged in a radial manner.  The spines are between 1 and 2 centimeters in length and are bristle like.

Reproduction 
The flowers of Neobuxbaumia polylopha are a deeply tinted red, a rarity among columnar cacti, which usually have white flowers.  The flowers grow on most of the areoles.  The areoles that produce flowers and the other vegetative areoles on the cactus are similar.  The areoles produce flowers for many years.  Flowers open up during the day and are pollinated by insects.  The fruits are small and green, and cylindrical in shape.  Seeds grow quickly, and can germinate in three weeks.  They are exposed to allow the birds to eat them quickly.  Fruits that are not eaten fall off and dry up.  The fruits are edible to humans and have a delicate, nutty flavor.  The growth of the population depends more on how many seedlings survive rather than on the growth and reproduction of older plants.

Notes

References 

polylopha
Cacti of Mexico
Endemic flora of Mexico
Flora of Guanajuato